Dadasaheb is an honorary title and given name.

Dadasaheb may refer to:
 Dadasaheb Gaikwad (1902–1971), Indian politician and social worker
 Dadasaheb Khaparde (1854–1938), Indian independence activist
 Dadasaheb Phalke (1870–1944), Indian filmmaker known as the Father of Indian cinema
 Dadasaheb Rupwate (1925–1999), Indian politician
 Dadasaheb Torne (1890–1960), Indian film director and producer
 Khashaba Dadasaheb Jadhav (1926–1984), Indian athlete

See also 
 Babasaheb (title)

Titles in India